Sharmaji Namkeen is a 2022 Indian Hindi-language comedy drama film written and directed by debutante Hitesh Bhatia, co-written by Supratik Sen, and produced by Ritesh Sidhwani and Farhan Akhtar under Excel Entertainment as well as Honey Trehan and Abhishek Chaubey under MacGuffin Pictures. 

Marking the first instance in cinematic history of two actors playing the same character simultaneously, it stars Rishi Kapoor in his posthumous appearance as the titular protagonist following his demise on 30 April 2020, and Paresh Rawal also playing the titular character, with Rawal finishing Kapoor's remaining scenes. Juhi Chawla, Suhail Nayyar, Isha Talwar and debutante Taaruk Raina feature in pivotal roles. Following its completion, the film premiered on Amazon Prime Video on 31 March 2022.

Plot
Brij Gopal Sharma a.k.a. Sharmaji, a middle-class widower, is asked to retire by his company Madhuban Home Appliances at the age of 58, much to his annoyance. A healthy and lively man, he lives with his sons Sandeep "Rinku" Sharma and Vinayak "Vincy" Sharma at his rather small home in Subhash Nagar, West Delhi. Rinku is in a relationship with his colleague Urmi Kaul, and the two of them plan on buying a flat in Gurgaon after they get married. Vincy is a final year B.Com student who is passionate about dance. Sharmaji is averse to the idea of moving away from his home of the past many years, causing Rinku to hide the fact that he is finalizing his apartment deal.

Seeking to overcome boredom, Sharmaji decides to venture into other hobbies, and also applies for a few jobs. After looking into Zumba classes, property brokerage, and various other small jobs, he reluctantly agrees, at the suggestion of his childhood friend Chaddha, to cook for kitty parties after an acquaintance of the latter, Manju Gulati, thanks him for a cooking job done well. During a second such party, he befriends Veena Manchanda, a boutique owner whose husband died in a car crash three years ago. He is warmly welcomed by the members of the kitty and soon caters to many occasions. At one such party, he meets Veena's dear friend Robbie Sachdeva, a politician, and he cooks for a religious meet at the latter's place.

On his birthday, Rinku invites their extended family over, and someone comes across a video of Sharmaji dancing at a kitty party. Rinku and Vincy are humiliated and furious at this and an argument ensues between the three of them, wherein Vincy reveals that Rinku is moving out and Rinku blurts out that Vincy failed his exams. Sharmaji is distraught at this but nevertheless, continues to follow his passion.

Veena and Sharmaji bond over the parties, and soon become close friends. One day, they overhear Rinku fighting with the flat builder Jain. He lies to them that all is well. That night, they meet Urmi's parents, where Sharmaji finds out that Urmi's father knows more about the flat than he does. On the way back, he confronts Rinku, who confesses that Jain is delaying the possession of the flat and that he paid 15 lakh rupees (₹ 1,500,000) as token money (deposit). Sharmaji is devastated to learn that his son spent so much money without even informing him, and decides to stop his catering hobby to focus more on things at home.

Rinku is informed at a municipal office that Jain has constructed the flats on illegal land, and is advised to get his token money back and get out of the deal. When Jain refuses to answer his calls, Rinku attacks the security guards at Jain's office and is arrested. Sharmaji is at a final kitty party when he gets the call from the station that his son has been arrested. He rushes to the police station with the ladies, and a comical turn of events ensues. He is put behind bars along with his son, while the ladies are made to sit in a corner. Unbeknownst to the constable, Sharmaji has a phone inside the cell. Veena communicates to Sharmaji, using hand signals, to call Robbie who uses his power as the Mayor of West Delhi to release them; while Sharmaji learns that Robbie is Veena's brother-in-law, Robbie asks Rinku to meet Jain later for retrieving his money.

While being driven back home, Rinku realizes his mistake and apologizes to his father for not being a good son. Sharmaji accepts his apology, and they all go back home.

Cast
Rishi Kapoor as Brij Gopal Sharma a.k.a. Sharmaji
Paresh Rawal appears as Sharmaji in scenes not featuring Kapoor, which were filmed after his demise
Juhi Chawla as Veena Manchanda
Suhail Nayyar as Sandeep "Rinku" Sharma, Brij Gopal Sharma's elder son 
Isha Talwar as Urmi Kaul
Taaruk Raina as Vinayak "Vincy" Sharma, Brij Gopal Sharma's younger son
Satish Kaushik as K. K. Chaddha, Sharmaji's friend 
Sulagna Panigrahi as Aarti Bhatia
Sheeba Chaddha as Manju Gulati
Ayesha Raza Mishra as Rupali Dhingra 
Parmeet Sethi as Mayor Robbie Sachdeva, Veena's brother-in-law
Gufi Paintal as Rajender Sharma
Shishir Sharma as Mr. Kaul, Urmi's father
Suparna Marwah as Mrs. Kaul, Urmi's mother
 Special appearance by Ranbir Kapoor in a pre-film message

Soundtrack 

The film's music is composed by Sneha Khanwalkar while lyrics written by Gopal Datt.

Reception 
The film received generally positive reviews from critics and audience with praise for its performances and direction.

Renuka Vyavahare of The Times Of India gave the film a rating of 4/5. Sukanya Verna of Rediff gave the film a rating of 4/5 and wrote "Sharmaji Namkeen is Rishi Kapoor's swansong and show. His cinematic memories are coloured in liveliest hues of celebration and happiness".

Bhavna Agarwal of Bollywood Bubble gave the film a rating of 4/5 and wrote "Late Rishi Kapoor and Paresh Rawal serve you a savoury and sweet story which tugs at your heartstrings. A must-watch for those who enjoy simple storytelling."

Simran Singh of Dna India gave the film a rating of 3.5/5 and wrote "Sharmaji Namkeen is a perfect ode to Rishi Kapoor, and this feel-good cinema is a fun-filled, emotional rollercoaster ride for the family". Shubham Kulkarni of Koimoi gave the film a rating of 3.5/5 and wrote "It marks the end of an era of Indian cinema and maybe the beginning of many good things". Prateek Sur of Outlook India gave the film a rating of 3.5/5 and wrote "Actor Rishi Kapoor's last film is a sweet and simple tale about parents after their retirement". Pratikshya Mishra of The Quint gave the film a rating of 3.5/5 and stated "'Sharmaji Namkeen' is a fitting send off to Rishi Kapoor's skill and stature". Saibal Chatterjee of NDTV gave the film a rating of 3/5 and wrote "In what is obviously an unusual experiment, Paresh Rawal steps into the breach in several key scenes, including the crucial climactic ones". Sanjana Jadhav of Pinkvilla gave the film a rating of 3/5 and wrote "Sharmaji Namkeen is strictly a few laughs with its heart in the right place". Anna MM Vetticad of Firstpost gave the film a rating of 3/5 and wrote "The single-role-divided-between-two-actors experiment is perfectly sewed by the naturalism in Hitesh Bhatia's storytelling, and the decision not to overtly manipulate our emotions either". Taran Adarsh of Bollywood Hungama gave the film a rating of 3/5 and wrote "Despite its shortcomings, SHARMAJI NAMKEEN is a heartwarming film and will leave viewers smiling".

Shubhra Gupta of Indian Express gave the film a rating of 2.5/5 and wrote "Rishi Kapoor is truly namkeen in this film, showing us how it is done, light on his feet, light in his eyes, a will to live. Jeena isi ka naam hai". Tushar Joshi of India Today stated "The story of Sharmaji Namkeen, Rishi Kapoor's last film, is not new but is a reminder that we've lost a terrific actor". Monika Rawal Kukreja of Hindustan Times stated "Rishi Kapoor and Paresh Rawal seamlessly share the story of an endearing retiree".

References

External links
 
 Sharmaji Namkeen at Bollywood Hungama

2022 films
Amazon Prime Video original films
Films scored by Sneha Khanwalkar
Indian comedy-drama films
2022 comedy-drama films
Films about families